Ærøskøbing Parish is a parish in the Diocese of Funen in Ærø Municipality, Denmark. The parish contains the town of Ærøskøbing.

References 

Parishes in Ærø Municipality
Parishes of Denmark